The shortbill spearfish (Tetrapturus angustirostris), sometimes called the short-nosed spearfish,  is a species of marlin native to the Indian and Pacific Oceans, with occasional records from the Atlantic Ocean. This species occurs in open waters not far from the surface. It is of minor importance to commercial fisheries and is also a game fish. Short bill spearfish are characterized by a slim frame with a blue body that is silver underneath. Shortbill also possess a very short bill extending from their upper jaw.

References
 Tony Ayling & Geoffrey Cox, Collins Guide to the Sea Fishes of New Zealand,  (William Collins Publishers Ltd, Auckland, New Zealand 1982) 

Fish described in 1915
Fish of the Pacific Ocean
Tetrapturus